Hollardia is a genus of spikefishes native to deep waters of the western Atlantic Ocean and the Pacific Ocean from around Hawaii.

Species
There are currently 3 recognized species in this genus:
 Hollardia goslinei J. C. Tyler, 1968 (Hawaiian spikefish)
 Hollardia hollardi Poey, 1861 (Reticulate spikefish)
 Hollardia meadi J. C. Tyler, 1966 (Spotted spikefish)

In 2020, new research in the Coral Sea by Australian scientists using a robotic submarine sent back pictures of what appears to be Hollardia hollardi, for the first time in an area not around Hawaii.

References

Tetraodontiformes
Marine fish genera
Taxa named by Felipe Poey